Wadi al-Ajbar is a sub-district located in Sanhan and Bani Bahlul District, Sana'a Governorate, Yemen. Wadi al-Ajbar had a population of 11156 according to the 2004 census.

References 

Sub-districts in Sanhan and Bani Bahlul District